The Cono Norte (recently being called Lima Norte) is one of the five areas that make up the Lima Metropolitan Area. It is located in the northern part of the metropolis, hence its name. The socioeconomic levels of its residents are varied. The districts of Ancón and Santa Rosa (both in the far north of the province) are the popular beach resorts (but not residential areas) for wealthier residents of Lima. The rest of the population comprises middle class and lower class residents. It is one of the most populated areas of Peru.

Districts 

The following districts are part of Lima Norte:

Ancón
Carabayllo
Comas
Independencia
Los Olivos 
Puente Piedra
Rímac (currently part of the downtown)
San Martín de Porres
Santa Rosa

References

External links

Geography of Lima